Bo Olof Svanberg (born January 5, 1967) is a Swedish former professional ice hockey player.

Career 
During his career he played for Färjestads BK between 1985 and 1988 and won during that period two Swedish Championship in 1986 and 1988. He then signed with Malmö IF and played with them until 1996 and won  his third and fourth Swedish Championship with Malmö in 1992 and 1994. In 1996, he signed with Austrian club Kapfenberger SV. But after one year with them he signed with German club Kassel Huskies. He only stayed one year with them also, and then signed once more Malmö IF. After two seasons with Malmö he ended his career in the lower leagues in Sweden. In 1985, he was drafted by the Detroit Red Wings as 218th pick overall, but he never played for the Red Wings.

Personal life 
His son Mattias is a professional footballer, playing for the Sweden national team.

References

External links
 

1967 births
Detroit Red Wings draft picks
EC Kapfenberg players
Färjestad BK players
Hvidovre Ligahockey players
Kassel Huskies players
Kristianstads IK players
Living people
Malmö Redhawks players
People from Hagfors
Swedish ice hockey centres
Sportspeople from Värmland County